Christopher Marshall (November 6, 1709 – May 4, 1797) was a leader in the American Revolution. Born in Dublin, Ireland, he went to America in 1727, settled in Philadelphia and worked as a chemist and pharmacist. Marshall is best known for The Remembrancer, a diary he kept during the Revolution, which was not published until 1839 (edited by William J. Duane) as Extracts from the Diary of Christopher Marshall, 1774-1781.

He died in Philadelphia.

External links
Short biography
 The Christopher Marshall Papers, including original diaries, handwritten transcripts and other printed materials, are available for research use at the Historical Society of Pennsylvania.

1709 births
1797 deaths
Kingdom of Ireland emigrants to the Thirteen Colonies